Bertie is a masculine given name. (See also Bertie (nickname).) Notable people with the name include:

 Bertie Brownlow (1920–2004), Tasmanian cricket player
 Bertie Childs (born 1894), British Olympic fencer
 Bertie Cooksley (1894–1980), New Zealand politician of the National Party
 Bertie Corbett (1875–1967), English footballer, cricketer and educator
 Bertie Cunningham, retired Irish Gaelic footballer (Irish name: Ailbhe Mac Cuinneagáin)
 Bertie Elkin (1886–1962), professional footballer
 Bertie Felstead (1894–2001), British First World War soldier and centenarian
 Bertie Fisher (1878–1972), British Army Second World War general
 Bertie Greatheed (1759–1826), English dramatist
 Berty Gunathilake (born 1924), Sri Lankan Sinhala actor and comedian
 Bertie Kirby (1887–1953), British politician and Labour Member of Parliament
 Bertie Milliner (1911–1975), Australian trade unionist, politician and senator
 Bertie Stevens (1886–1943), English cricketer
 Bertie Óg Murphy (born 1954), retired Irish hurling manager and player (Irish name: Parthalan Óg Ó Murchú)

Fictional characters:
 Bertie the Bus, a character from Thomas and Friends
 Bertie Wooster, in P. G. Wodehouse's Jeeves novels
 Bertie Pollock ("The World According to Bertie", by Alexander McCall Smith)
 "Bertie", the name given to Berthier in the English dub of the anime Sailor Moon
 Bertie Bassett, a mascot for the Bassett's brand of Liquorice Allsorts
 Bertie Beaver, the forest fire prevention character symbol of the Alberta Forest Service, similar in purpose to Smokey Bear
 Hubie and Bertie, animated cartoon mouse characters in the Warner Bros. Looney Tunes and Merrie Melodies cartoons

Masculine given names